The Dallas Stallions were an American professional roller hockey team based at Reunion Arena in Dallas, Texas, that played in Roller Hockey International. Never financially sound, the team concluded the 1999 season with scant attendance and a 7–17–0–2 record.

Year-by-year

History 
In the Spring of 1999, the Dallas Stallions were announced as an expansion franchise for the struggling Roller Hockey International. The team was operated on a very small budget that allowed for almost no advertising. The head coach/general manager was former NHL player Alan May. The team was made up from minor league ice hockey players. Training camp was held in the spring/summer of 1999 at Slapshot Inline Hockey arena in Arlington, Texas.

The team attempted to make a splash by drafting Central Hockey League legend Doug Lawrence. Lawrence reportedly refused to play unless he was paid additional money "under the table". A deal was finally worked out and Lawrence played in three games with the team.

The season was largely unsuccessful on every front. The team struggled on the floor, and only a handful of fans attended each home game. The Stallions and the league both quietly folded at the end of the season. May moved on to coach the Lubbock Cotton Kings of the Western Professional Hockey League.

References

External links
Dallas Stallions at HockeyDB

 
Roller Hockey International teams
Sports clubs established in 1999
Sports clubs disestablished in 1999
Sports in Dallas
1999 establishments in Texas
1999 disestablishments in Texas